Big Brother Suomi VIP was the second celebrity season and the thirteenth season overall of the Finnish reality show Big Brother Suomi. The show started on 2 May 2021, on Nelonen and finished on 20 May 2021, lasted for three weeks.

Anni Hautala hosted the live shows alongside Tinni Wikström, Kimmo Vehviläinen hosted the Daily Show. In this season, the live eviction shows were held four times a week, on Tuesdays, Thursdays, Saturdays and Sundays. On Mondays, Wednesdays and Fridays, there were three Daily Shows featuring a summary of events that happened in a day and analyze twists and turns with various guests and evicted housemates.

After the previous two seasons took place in 2019 and 2020, the Big Brother house moved from the shopping center Redi located in Kalasatama to a new location in Vantaa.

The winner of Big Brother Suomi VIP was Petra Maarit Olli and the grand prize for the winner was €30,000.

Housemates

Nominations table
The first housemate in each box was nominated for two points, and the second housemate was nominated for one point.

Notes 
 : All housemates were nominated for eviction. During the live show on Tuesday (Day 3), voting pauses several times between each round of save. Aleksi, Kelly and Petra received the least votes, then, they went to the studio and voting continues between them. In the end, Kelly received the least votes of 27.6% and she was evicted.
 : After the eviction of Kelly, Aleksi and Petra had an immunity challenge live in the studio for the immunity on the next round of eviction, Aleksi won. As a consolation prize, Petra received a time bomb. Big Brother announced that the housemate who holds the time bomb in their hands when the time bomb explodes will automatically be nominated. Housemates were not been told when the bomb would explode. On Day 4, the time bomb "exploded" on Nina's hand, therefore, she was nominated for eviction.
 : After the eviction of Toni, Nina and Rosa had an immunity challenge live in the studio for the immunity on the next round of eviction, Nina won.
 : The second nominations were held on Day 6, but the nominees were not decided until after the nomination competition. Sedu would have also nominated for eviction based on the nomination points, but he won the nomination competition. As a prize, Sedu saved himself and he replaced Markku for eviction.
 : After the eviction of Rosa, Janne and Sanna had an immunity challenge live in the studio for the immunity on the next round of eviction, Janne won.
 : For this round of eviction, all housemates except Janne were nominated, one of them would be evicted on the next day (Day 8).
 : For this round of nominations, there were no nominations been held, instead, the housemates were split into two teams and the nominees were decided by the outcome of the cooking theme nomination task.  Blue team: Janne, Nina, Pinja, Roni and Sedu.  Red team: Aleksi, Markku, Petra, Sanna and Sara. The blue team won the race in the evening and the red team was nominated for eviction.
 : For this round of nominations, the housemates still split into two teams. The red team won the nomination competition. They had to choose one of their team members to receive the immunity, they chose Aleksi. And they had to choose one of the members of the blue team to be nominated for eviction. Roni volunteered to be nominated.
 : Aleksi and Pinja swapped teams. The blue team won the nomination competition and they got their nomination points doubled.
 : This round of eviction was a double eviction, the two housemates who received the least votes would be evicted.
 : For the final round of eviction, all housemates were nominated for eviction, one housemate would be evicted before the final.

References

External links 
 Official website
 Big Brother Suomi at Ruutu.fi

11
Finland
2021 Finnish television seasons